Tor Heiestad (born 13 January 1962) is a Norwegian shooter.

He was born in Oslo, but represented the club Bærum JK. He became Olympic champion in the 50 metre running target in Seoul 1988. The event was then discontinued, so in Barcelona 1992 he placed tenth in the 10 metre running target event. He won the European Championship in the same event in 1990, in addition to four Nordic titles. On national level he has one King's Cup and many Norwegian championships.

References

1962 births
Living people
Norwegian male sport shooters
Running target shooters
Shooters at the 1988 Summer Olympics
Shooters at the 1992 Summer Olympics
Olympic shooters of Norway
Olympic gold medalists for Norway
Olympic medalists in shooting

Medalists at the 1988 Summer Olympics
Sportspeople from Oslo
20th-century Norwegian people